Emma Mason (born 28 June 1986) is a retired Scottish badminton player.

Career 
Mason, aged 10, started playing badminton in primary school as her mother had volunteered to run the after school club. She won the Scottish junior title in women's doubles in 2006. In 2008, she won Scottish National Championship with Imogen Bankier. She won the same title in 2010 (with Imogen Bankier) and 2011 (with Jillie Cooper) also. In 2008, she snapped her Achilles tendon in the match at Portuguese Open and returned only after an year. Her first match after rehabilitation was in Sudirman Cup 2009. She also represented her country in the 2010 Delhi Commonwealth games. Additionally, she also played for Scotland at the European and World championships. She shortly ended her playing career after that.

Mason has 27 caps for her country and, in 2010, was elected by her fellow players to the World Badminton Federation's Athletes Commission. Mason was Vice-Chair from 2010 to 2012. She became the first ever female Chair of the Athlete's Commission, a position she held until her term ended in 2015. As Chair of the commission, Mason was a full voting member of the World Badminton Federation's Council. Currently, she is a director of Badminton Europe Confederation, a member of British Showjumping's Disciplinary Panel and of British Triathlon's Audit and Governance Committee. She has an undergraduate degree in Chemistry with a dissertation focusing on the EPO test and the Athlete Biological Passport. She is also a graduate of UK Sport's International Leadership Programme and a 2015 WeAreTheCity Rising Star in the category of sport.

Achievements

BWF International 
Women's doubles

Mixed doubles

  BWF International Challenge tournament
  BWF International Series tournament

References 

1986 births
Living people
Scottish female badminton players
Badminton players at the 2010 Commonwealth Games
Commonwealth Games competitors for Scotland